Phyllonorycter fruticosella is a moth of the family Gracillariidae. It is known from the Russian Far East and the central Asian part of Russia.

The larvae feed on Alnus viridis fruticosa. They probably mine the leaves of their host plant.

References

fruticosella
Moths of Asia
Moths described in 1979